Edmund Burton (1893 – 13 August 1916) was an English professional footballer who played as a forward in the Football League for Bristol City.

Personal life 
Burton served as a private in the Durham Light Infantry during the First World War. He was killed in action during the Battle of the Somme on 13 August 1916 and was buried in Englebelmer Communal Cemetery.

Career statistics

References

1893 births
1916 deaths
People from County Durham (before 1974)
English footballers
English Football League players
Association football forwards
British Army personnel of World War I
Military personnel from County Durham
Durham Light Infantry soldiers
British military personnel killed in the Battle of the Somme
Shildon A.F.C. players
Bristol City F.C. players
Burials in Commonwealth War Graves Commission cemeteries in France
Footballers from Tyne and Wear